The 2019 Portuguese legislative election was held on 6 October 2019. All 230 seats to the Assembly of the Republic were contested.

In a campaign dominated by the Tancos airbase robbery (in which former Defense Minister Azeredo Lopes (2015–2018) was accused of trying to cover-up the finding of the stolen weapons in the robbery), but also with the good economic situation in Portugal, the Socialist Party (PS) won the elections with 36% of the votes and 108 seats, a gain of 22 compared with 2015. The PS won the big districts of Porto and Lisbon, although Porto was closer than expected, and was able to gain districts from the PSD, like Aveiro and Viana do Castelo, by razor thin margins. The PS won the city of Lisbon, however with a smaller share of the vote compared with 2015, 33% vs 35%, and, surprisingly, lost the city of Porto to the PSD.

The Social Democratic Party (PSD) obtained 28% of the votes and won 79 seats. The party lost 10 seats compared with 2015, and, in terms of share of vote, it was the worst result since 1983, however in terms of seats, it was only the worst result since 2005, when the party won 75 seats. The PSD was able to hold on to their bastions of Viseu, Vila Real, Bragança, Leiria and Madeira. On election night, PSD leader Rui Rio classified the results as "not a disaster" and left the door open to continue as party leader. However, in the aftermath of the election, several members of the party announced their intention to challenge Rio's leadership.

The Left Bloc (BE) achieved a similar result to 2015. The party won almost 10% of the votes and held the 19 seats elected in 2015. On election night, Catarina Martins said she was open to new negotiations with PS. The Unitary Democratic Coalition, (CDU), PCP-PEV coalition, suffered heavy losses, with  6.3% of the votes and 12 seats, and Jerónimo de Sousa, PCP secretary-general, said on election night that written agreements with PS were off the table. CDS – People's Party got just 4.2% of the votes, and got a parliamentary caucus reduced to just 5 seats, the lowest since 1991 and when the party was called the "taxi party", down from 18 in the 2015 election. Assunção Cristas, CDS leader, resigned on election night, called for a snap party congress and announced she would not run for reelection. People-Animals-Nature (PAN) saw a big increase in its share of the vote, winning 3.3% and 4 seats from Lisbon, Porto and Setúbal.

This election was marked by the entry of three new parties in Parliament. The right-wing/far-right party CHEGA (CH) was one of the big surprises on election night by electing an MP from Lisbon. It is the first time since the return to democracy that a right-wing/far-right party is represented in Parliament. LIVRE and Liberal Initiative also elected one MP for Lisbon. Former Prime Minister and PSD leader Pedro Santana Lopes' new party, Alliance, failed to win a single seat and polled below 1% of the votes.

The turnout in this election was the lowest ever in a general election in Portugal, with just 48.6% of registered voters casting a ballot. In Portugal alone, 54.5% of voters cast a ballot, a drop compared with the 57% in the 2015 election.

Background

2015 Government formation

After the 2015 elections, President Aníbal Cavaco Silva asked incumbent Prime Minister Pedro Passos Coelho to form a minority government, as the Portugal Ahead coalition won the most votes and seats in the election. Passos Coelho second government was sworn in on 30 October 2015. However, during this period, the Socialist Party, the Left Bloc and the Communist Party reached a historic agreement in order to bring down the Passos Coelho minority government and support a Socialist minority government led by António Costa. Paulo Portas, CDS–PP leader, labeled the agreement as the Geringonça, which became the name the left-wing agreement would be known for. 

On 10 November 2015, the left-wing parties proposed a vote of rejection to the Portugal Ahead's government program, which was approved by a 123 to 107 vote, thus bringing down the government. On 26 November 2015, António Costa was sworn in as Prime Minister.

Leadership changes

CDS–PP leadership election 2016
Following the collapse of the PàF minority government and the subsequent nomination of António Costa as Prime Minister, with the support of the leftwing parties, CDS–PP leader Paulo Portas announced, on December 2015, he was leaving the party's leadership. A new party congress was called to elect a new leader. There were two candidates in the ballot: Assunção Cristas, supported by Portas, and Miguel Mattos Chaves, critical of Portas leadership. Cristas was elected by a landslide and the results were the following:

|- style="background-color:#E9E9E9"
! align="center" colspan=2 style="width:  60px"|Candidate
! align="center" style="width:  50px"|Votes
! align="center" style="width:  50px"|%
|-
|bgcolor=|
| align=left | Assunção Cristas
| align=right | 877
| align=right | 98.8
|-
|bgcolor=|
| align=left | Miguel Mattos Chaves
| align=right | 11
| align=right | 1.2
|-
|- style="background-color:#E9E9E9"
| colspan=2 style="text-align:left;" |   Turnout
| align=right | 888
| align=right | 
|-
| colspan="4" align=left|Source: Results
|}

PSD leadership election 2018

After a disappointing result in the 2017 local elections, in which the PSD won just 30% of the votes and 98 mayoral races against the 38% of the PS and its 160 elected mayors, Pedro Passos Coelho announced he would not run for a 5th term as PSD leader. After that, Rui Rio, former mayor of Porto (2002-2013), announced he was running for the leadership. Shortly after, Pedro Santana Lopes, former mayor of Lisbon (2002-2004; 2005) and Prime Minister (2004-2005), announced he was also running for the leadership of the party. Election day was scheduled to January 13, 2018. After a long campaign, Rui Rio was elected with 54.15% of the votes, against the 45.85% of Santana Lopes. Turnout was 60.3%. The results were the following:

|- style="background-color:#E9E9E9"
! align="center" colspan=2 style="width:  60px"|Candidate
! align="center" style="width:  50px"|Votes
! align="center" style="width:  50px"|%
|-
|bgcolor=orange|
| align=left | Rui Rio
| align=right | 22,728
| align=right | 54.2
|-
|bgcolor=orange|
| align=left | Pedro Santana Lopes
| align=right | 19,244
| align=right | 45.8
|-
| colspan=2 align=left | Blank/Invalid ballots
| align=right | 683
| align=right | –
|-
|- style="background-color:#E9E9E9"
| colspan=2 style="text-align:left;" |   Turnout
| align=right | 42,655
| align=right | 60.34
|-
| colspan="4" align=left|Source: Official results
|}

Rui Rio was officially confirmed as party leader in the PSD congress, in Lisbon, between 16 and 18 February 2018. Just seven months after this leadership election, in early July 2018, Pedro Santana Lopes announced he was leaving the Social Democratic Party and would form his own party. A few weeks later he announced the creation of a new party, the Alliance.

Date 

According to the Portuguese Constitution, an election must be called between 14 September and 14 October of the year that the legislature ends. The election is called by the President of Portugal but is not called at the request of the Prime Minister; however, the President must listen to all of the parties represented in Parliament and the election day must be announced at least 60 days before the election. If an election is called during an ongoing legislature (dissolution of parliament) it must be held at least in 55 days. Election day is the same in all multi-seats constituencies, and should fall on a Sunday or national holiday. The next legislative election must, therefore, take place no later than 13 October 2019. After meeting with all parties, in December 2018, Marcelo Rebelo de Sousa announced that he would call a general election for 6 October 2019.

Electoral system 
The Assembly of the Republic has 230 members elected to four-year terms. Governments do not require absolute majority support of the Assembly to hold office, as even if the number of opposers of government is larger than that of the supporters, the number of opposers still needs to be equal or greater than 116 (absolute majority) for both the Government's Programme to be rejected or for a motion of no confidence to be approved.

The number of seats assigned to each district depends on the district magnitude. The use of the d'Hondt method makes for a higher effective threshold than certain other allocation methods such as the Hare quota or Sainte-Laguë method, which are more generous to small parties.

For these elections, and compared with the 2015 elections, the MPs distributed by districts were the following:

Early voting
Voters were also able to vote early, which would happen one week before election day, on 29 September 2019. Voters had to register in order to be eligible to cast an early ballot. Between 22 and 26 September, 56,287 voters requested to vote early. On 29 September, 50,638 voters (90.0% of voters that requested) cast an early ballot.

Parties

Parliamentary factions 
The table below lists the parties represented in the Assembly of the Republic during the 13th legislature (2015–2019) and that also contested the elections:

Non represented parties 
The table below lists smaller parties not represented in the Assembly of the Republic that ran in the elections:

Campaign period

Party slogans

Candidates' debates

With parties represented in Parliament

With parties not represented in Parliament
A debate between parties not represented in Parliament was also broadcast on RTP1 and RTP3.

Opinion polling

Results
The centre-left Socialist Party (PS) of incumbent Prime Minister Costa obtained the largest share of the vote, and the most seats. Costa said he would look to continue the confidence-and-supply agreement with the Left Bloc and the Unitary Democratic Coalition. The centre-right Social Democratic Party (PSD) got 27.8 percent of the vote, its worst result since 1983. Portugal's much-vaunted immunity to Europe's far-right wave was interrupted by the election of a debut representative from the nationalist CHEGA party, which scored 1.3 percent overall, with the party's leader stating “this is an historic occasion, it will be the first time in 45 years that a party with these characteristics enters the assembly.”

National summary

Distribution by constituency

|- class="unsortable"
!rowspan=2|Constituency!!%!!S!!%!!S!!%!!S!!%!!S!!%!!S!!%!!S!!%!!S!!%!!S!!%!!S
!rowspan=2|TotalS
|- class="unsortable" style="text-align:center;"
!colspan=2 | PS
!colspan=2 | PSD
!colspan=2 | BE
!colspan=2 | CDU
!colspan=2 | CDS–PP
!colspan=2 | PAN
!colspan=2 | CH
!colspan=2 | IL
!colspan=2 | L
|-
| style="text-align:left;" | Azores
| style="background:; color:white;"| 40.1
| 3
| 30.2
| 2
| 8.0
| -
| 2.5
| -
| 4.8
| -
| 2.7
| -
| 0.9
| -
| 0.7
| -
| 0.9
| -
| 5
|-
| style="text-align:left;" | Aveiro
| style="background:; color:white;"| 34.3
| 7
| 33.6
| 6
| 10.0
| 2
| 3.1
| -
| 5.7
| 1
| 3.0
| -
| 0.7
| -
| 1.0
| -
| 0.7
| -
| 16
|-
| style="text-align:left;" | Beja
| style="background:; color:white;"| 40.7
| 2
| 13.3
| -
| 9.1
| -
| 22.8
| 1
| 2.3
| -
| 2.0
| -
| 2.0
| -
| 0.4
| -
| 0.6
| -
| 3
|-
| style="text-align:left;" | Braga
| style="background:; color:white;"| 36.4
| 8
| 34.1
| 8
| 8.9
| 2
| 4.0
| -
| 4.1
| 1
| 2.6
| -
| 0.7
| -
| 0.8
| -
| 0.7
| -
| 19
|-
| style="text-align:left;" | Bragança
| 36.5
| 1
| style="background:; color:white;"| 40.8
| 2
| 6.0
| -
| 2.1
| -
| 4.5
| -
| 1.3
| -
| 0.8
| -
| 0.4
| -
| 0.3
| -
| 3
|-
| style="text-align:left;" | Castelo Branco
| style="background:; color:white;"| 40.9
| 3
| 26.3
| 1
| 11.1
| -
| 4.8
| -
| 3.7
| -
| 2.4
| -
| 1.3
| -
| 0.6
| -
| 0.9
| -
| 4
|-
| style="text-align:left;" | Coimbra
| style="background:; color:white;"| 39.0
| 5
| 26.6
| 3
| 11.2
| 1
| 5.6
| -
| 3.5
| -
| 2.6
| -
| 0.9
| -
| 0.8
| -
| 0.9
| -
| 9
|-
| style="text-align:left;" | Évora
| style="background:; color:white;"| 38.3
| 2
| 17.5
| -
| 9.0
| -
| 18.9
| 1
| 3.4
| -
| 2.0
| -
| 2.2
| -
| 0.7
| -
| 0.7
| -
| 3
|-
| style="text-align:left;" | Faro
| style="background:; color:white;"| 36.8
| 5
| 22.3
| 3
| 12.3
| 1
| 7.1
| -
| 3.8
| -
| 4.8
| -
| 2.1
| -
| 0.8
| -
| 1.0
| -
| 9
|-
| style="text-align:left;" | Guarda
| style="background:; color:white;"| 37.6
| 2
| 34.3
| 1
| 7.8
| -
| 3.0
| -
| 5.0
| -
| 1.6
| -
| 1.5
| -
| 0.6
| -
| 0.5
| -
| 3
|-
| style="text-align:left;" | Leiria
| 31.1
| 4
| style="background:; color:white;"| 33.5
| 5
| 9.4
| 1
| 4.3
| -
| 5.3
| -
| 2.9
| -
| 1.5
| -
| 0.9
| -
| 0.9
| -
| 10
|-
| style="text-align:left;" | Lisbon
| style="background:; color:white;"| 36.7
| 20
| 22.6
| 12
| 9.7
| 5
| 7.8
| 4
| 4.4
| 2
| 4.4
| 2
| 2.0
| 1
| 2.5
| 1
| 2.1
| 1
| 48
|-
| style="text-align:left;" | Madeira
| 33.4
| 3
| style="background:; color:white;"| 37.1
| 3
| 5.2
| -
| 2.1
| -
| 6.1
| -
| 1.8
| -
| 0.7
| -
| 0.7
| -
| 0.4
| -
| 6
|-
| style="text-align:left;" | Portalegre
| style="background:; color:white;"| 44.7
| 2
| 20.1
| -
| 8.1
| -
| 10.6
| -
| 3.8
| -
| 1.7
| -
| 2.7
| -
| 0.5
| -
| 0.6
| -
| 2
|-
| style="text-align:left;" | Porto
| style="background:; color:white;"| 36.7
| 17
| 31.2
| 15
| 10.1
| 4
| 4.8
| 2
| 3.3
| 1
| 3.5
| 1
| 0.6
| -
| 1.5
| -
| 1.0
| -
| 40
|-
| style="text-align:left;" | Santarém
| style="background:; color:white;"| 37.1
| 4
| 25.2
| 3
| 10.2
| 1
| 7.6
| 1
| 4.7
| -
| 2.6
| -
| 2.0
| -
| 0.8
| -
| 0.9
| -
| 9
|-
| style="text-align:left;" | Setúbal
| style="background:; color:white;"| 38.6
| 9
| 14.4
| 3
| 12.1
| 2
| 15.8
| 3
| 3.0
| -
| 4.4
| 1
| 1.9
| -
| 1.1
| -
| 1.2
| -
| 18
|-
| style="text-align:left;" | Viana do Castelo
| style="background:; color:white;"| 34.8
| 3
| 33.8
| 3
| 8.5
| -
| 4.0
| -
| 6.2
| -
| 2.4
| -
| 0.7
| -
| 0.6
| -
| 0.6
| -
| 6
|-
| style="text-align:left;" | Vila Real
| 37.2
| 2
| style="background:; color:white;"| 39.0
| 3
| 6.1
| -
| 2.5
| -
| 4.5
| -
| 1.7
| -
| 0.8
| -
| 0.4
| -
| 0.6
| -
| 5
|-
| style="text-align:left;" | Viseu
| 35.4
| 4
| style="background:; color:white;"| 36.2
| 4
| 7.9
| -
| 2.3
| -
| 5.9
| -
| 2.1
| -
| 1.0
| -
| 0.6
| -
| 0.5
| -
| 8
|-
| style="text-align:left;" | Europe
| style="background:; color:white;"| 29.1
| 1
| 18.8
| 1
| 5.7
| -
| 2.5
| -
| 3.0
| -
| 4.9
| -
| 0.9
| -
| 0.8
| -
| 1.1
| -
| 2
|-
| style="text-align:left;" | Outside Europe
| 20.2
| 1
| style="background:; color:white;"| 33.4
| 1
| 3.5
| -
| 1.0
| -
| 4.7
| -
| 4.3
| -
| 0.9
| -
| 2.5
| -
| 0.7
| -
| 2
|- class="unsortable" style="background:#E9E9E9"
| style="text-align:left;" | Total
| style="background:; color:white;"| 36.3
| 108
| 27.8
| 79
| 9.5
| 19
| 6.3
| 12
| 4.2
| 5
| 3.3
| 4
| 1.3
| 1
| 1.3
| 1
| 1.1
| 1
| 230
|-
| colspan=20 style="text-align:left;" | Source: Comissão Nacional de Eleições
|}

Maps

Electorate

Aftermath

Budget rejection and fall of the government

After the October 2019 elections, the PS decided to not renew the "Geringonça" (Contraption) deal with the Left Bloc and the Communist Party and opted to govern by making deals with both left and/or right parties in the opposition. After this, budgets and other policies were discussed with all opposition parties, but political instability grew, even during the Covid-19 pandemic outbreak. On October 2021, BE and PCP announced that they would vote against the government's proposed 2022 budget and President Marcelo Rebelo de Sousa warned that if there was no budget, he would dissolve Parliament and call a snap election. On 27 October 2021, Parliament rejected the budget by a 117 to 108 vote, and a snap general election was called for 30 January 2022.

See also
 Elections in Portugal
 List of political parties in Portugal
 Politics of Portugal

Notes

References

External links 
 Popstar Poll Tracker
 Marktest Opinion Poll Tracker
 Official results site, Portuguese Justice Ministry
 Portuguese Electoral Commission
 ERC - Official publication of polls
 Average of polls and seat simulator

Portuguese
Legislative elections in Portugal
October 2019 events in Portugal